UFC 67: All or Nothing  was a mixed martial arts event held by Ultimate Fighting Championship. The event was held Saturday, February 3, 2007, at the Mandalay Bay Events Center on the Las Vegas Strip in Nevada. It was also the first UFC pay-per-view broadcast in High-Definition.

Background
This event was the first UFC pay-per-view event since UFC 60 to have no championship bouts on the card. In the main event, the middleweight winner of The Ultimate Fighter 4, Travis Lutter was scheduled to challenge middleweight champion Anderson Silva for the middleweight title, however he was not able to make weight and the fight was changed to a non-title contest.

The welterweight winner of The Ultimate Fighter 4, Matt Serra, was also scheduled to challenge the welterweight champion Georges St-Pierre. However, St.-Pierre injured a knee during training and the bout was postponed.

Two former PRIDE stars made their debuts in the UFC at this event. 2006 PRIDE Open-Weight Grand Prix Champion Mirko Cro Cop made his debut in the United States and in the UFC at UFC 67 against Eddie Sanchez.

Quinton Jackson — whose contract was acquired by the UFC after Zuffa's buyout of the World Fighting Alliance — made his debut against Marvin Eastman, whose contract with the WFA was also bought by Zuffa. Eastman has an early win over Jackson in the KOTC promotion. It was also the UFC debut of future Light Heavyweight Champion, Lyoto Machida and also the debut of the future Lightweight Champion Frankie Edgar.

Results

Bonus awards

Fight of the Night: Frankie Edgar vs. Tyson Griffin
Knockout of the Night: Terry Martin
Submission of the Night: Anderson Silva

See also
 Ultimate Fighting Championship
 List of UFC champions
 List of UFC events
 2007 in UFC

References

External links

Official UFC 67 website
Official UFC 67 Fight Card

Ultimate Fighting Championship events
2007 in mixed martial arts
Mixed martial arts in Las Vegas
2007 in sports in Nevada